Moradkhanli (also Romanized as Morādkhānlī; also known as Morādkhānlū and Qeshlāq Morād Khānlū) is a village in Qareh Chay Rural District, in the Central District of Saveh County, Markazi Province, Iran. At the 2006 census, its population was 145, in 30 families.

References 

Populated places in Saveh County